Khinvsar is one of the 200 Legislative Assembly constituencies of Rajasthan state in India. It is in Nagaur district and is a part of Nagaur (Lok Sabha constituency).

Members of Legislative Assembly

Election results

2018

See also
 Khinvsar
 Nagaur district
 List of constituencies of Rajasthan Legislative Assembly

References

Nagaur district
Assembly constituencies of Rajasthan